Ward Horton Bell (July 20, 1896 – July, 1976) was an American football, basketball, and track coach. He served as the head football coach at Black Hills State University–then known as Spearfish Normal College–from 1924 to 1925. He also served as Spearfish's men's basketball coach from 1924 to 1926.

Ward moveded to Huron, South Dakota, where he served as the head football coach and track coach at Huron College.

Head coaching record

Football

References

External links
 

1896 births
1976 deaths
Basketball coaches from Oklahoma
Black Hills State Yellow Jackets football coaches
Black Hills State Yellow Jackets men's basketball coaches
Huron Screaming Eagles football coaches
College track and field coaches in the United States
People from Pittsburg County, Oklahoma